Coleophora iljiniae is a moth of the family Coleophoridae. It is found in Kazakhstan.

The larvae feed on Iljinia regelii. They feed on the leaves of their host plant.

References

iljiniae
Moths described in 1989
Moths of Asia